Litchfield is a town in and former county seat of Litchfield County, Connecticut, United States. The population was 8,192 at the 2020 census. The boroughs of Bantam and Litchfield are located within the town. There are also three unincorporated villages: East Litchfield, Milton, and Northfield. Northfield, located in the southeastern corner of Litchfield, is home to a high percentage of the Litchfield population.

History
Originally called Bantam township, Litchfield incorporated in 1719. The town derives its name from Lichfield, in England.

In 1751 it became the county-seat of Litchfield county, and at the same time the borough of Litchfield (incorporated in 1879) was laid out. From 1776 to 1780 two depots for military stores and a workshop for the Continental army were maintained, and the leaden statue of George III., erected in Bowling Green (New York City), in 1770, and torn down by citizens on the 9th of July 1776, was cut up and taken to Litchfield, where, in the house of Oliver Wolcott it was melted into bullets for the American army by Wolcott's daughter and sister.

During the American Revolutionary War several prominent Loyalists were held prisoner in the town, including William Franklin, son of Benjamin Franklin, and David Mathews, Mayor of New York City.

In 1784, the first law school in the United States, the so-named Litchfield Law School, was established by judge and legal scholar Tapping Reeve. Prior to its establishment Reeve had accepted several legal apprentices since he had settled there in 1773, but saw such demand for his expertise that he formally opened the one-room school within a decade. During the school's fifty year history it would accept more than 1,100 students, including Aaron Burr, Jr., Horace Mann, and Levi Woodbury, the first justice of the US Supreme Court to attend law school.

Litchfield was also home to a pioneering institution of young women's education, the Litchfield Female Academy, founded in 1792 by Sarah Pierce.

Litchfield has a very rich history. The Litchfield Historical Society, located in the center of town, contains a wide variety of items with historical importance to the town.

Geography
Located southwest of Torrington, Litchfield also includes part of Bantam Lake. According to the United States Census Bureau, the town has a total area of 56.8 square miles (147.1 km2), of which, 56.1 square miles (145.2 km2) of it is land and 0.7 square miles (1.9 km2) of it (1.3%) is water.

Principal communities
Bantam (borough)
East Litchfield (unincorporated village)
Litchfield (borough / town center)
Milton (unincorporated village)
Northfield (unincorporated village)

Demographics 

As of the census of 2000, there were 8,316 people, 3,310 households, and 2,303 families residing in the town. The racial makeup of the town was 96.99% White, 0.75% Black or African American, 0.23% Native American, 0.47% Asian, 0.01% Pacific Islander, 0.46% from other races, and 1.09% from two or more races. Hispanic or Latino of any race were 1.56% of the population.

There were 3,310 households, out of which 31.2% had children under the age of 18 living with them, 59.9% were married couples living together, 7.2% had a female householder with no husband present, and 30.4% were non-families. 26.5% of all households were made up of individuals, and 13.2% had someone living alone who was 65 years of age or older. The average household size was 2.45 and the average family size was 2.98.

In the town, the population was spread out, with 25.2% under the age of 18, 3.6% from 18 to 24, 25.6% from 25 to 44, 28.6% from 45 to 64, and 17.0% who were 65 years of age or older. The median age was 43 years. For every 100 females, there were 92.5 males. For every 100 females age 18 and over, there were 90.3 males.

The median income for a household in the town was $58,418, and the median income for a family was $70,594. Males had a median income of $50,284 versus $31,787 for females. The per capita income for the town was $30,096. About 2.8% of families and 4.0% of the population were below the poverty line, including 2.6% of those under age 18 and 5.2% of those age 65 or over.

Government and infrastructure 

The 1812 Litchfield County Jail, the town's oldest public building, is in Litchfield. While controlled by the Connecticut state government, the facility historically held inmates convicted of minor offenses. Governor of Connecticut Lowell P. Weicker Jr. ordered the facility closed for financial reasons in 1993. It was converted into the McAuliffe Manor, a substance abuse treatment center for women operated by Naugatuck Valley HELP Inc., but in 2009 the contract between Naugatuck Valley HELP Inc. and the state expired, leading to the closure of McAuliffe Manor.

Transportation 
U.S. Route 202 is the main east-west road connecting Bantam and Litchfield center to the city of Torrington and New Milford, Connecticut. Route 63 runs north-south through the town center. The Route 8 expressway runs along the town line with Harwinton. It can be accessed from the town center via Route 118. The town is also served by buses from the Northwestern Connecticut Transit District connecting to the city of Torrington. The Shepaug Valley Railroad opened a Litchfield terminal in 1872, but passenger service ended in 1930 and freight service in 1948.

Education

Litchfield Public Schools operates public schools. Litchfield High School is the area high school. Students may also attend Wamogo Regional Six to study agriculture, located in Litchfield, or Oliver Wolcott Technical School, located in Torrington, Connecticut.

Litchfield Center School hosts children in grades K–3 with a Pre-K program available. Students then move on to Litchfield Intermediate School where they will remain through sixth grade. Students then finish their Litchfield Public School career at Litchfield High School.

Litchfield is also home to Forman School, a private boarding school for students in grades 9–12/PG with learning differences such as ADD/ADHD and dyslexia.

Notable people

 Andrew Adams, political leader during and after the Revolutionary War
 Josephine Cables Aldrich (1843–1917), spiritualist, Theosophist, editor, and publisher
 Ethan Allen, one of the founders of Vermont
 Catharine Beecher, educator
 Henry Ward Beecher, Congregationalist clergyman
 Lyman Beecher, Presbyterian minister
 Mary Charlotte Ward Granniss Webster Billings, writer, evangelist, and missionary
 
 Solyman Brown, creator of the first dental school
 Adelaide Deming, painter
 Dick Ebersol, television executive
 Caroline Fitzgerald (1865–1911), poet
 Eugene Fodor, travel writer
 Jerome Fuller, chief justice of Minnesota Territorial Supreme Court, 1851–1852
 Elizabeth Gilbert, author of Eat, Pray, Love
 Jane Grant, writer
 F. Norton Goddard, Republican politician
 Benjamin Hanks (1755–1824), goldsmith and instrument maker
 Uriel Holmes, US congressman
 Isabella Beecher Hooker, women's suffrage activist
 Susan Saint James, actress
 Daniel Albion "Jumping Jack" Jones (1860–1936), professional baseball pitcher
 Madeleine L'Engle, author
 Thomas McKnight, painter
 Charles B. McVay III, US naval officer
 Phineas Miner, US congressman
 Joseph Robert Morris, entrepreneur, investor, mayor of Houston, Texas; born and raised in Milton
 Samuel S. Phelps, US senator from Vermont
 Sarah Pierce, teacher, educator and founder of the Litchfield Female Academy
 John Pierpoint, Chief Justice of the Vermont Supreme Court
 Robert Pierpoint, Lieutenant Governor of Vermont
 Austin M. Purves Jr., 20th century artist and educator
 Tapping Reeve, lawyer, judge, and law educator
 Mary Livingston Ripley, horticulturist, entomologist, and photographer
 Richard Skinner, governor of Vermont
 Roger Skinner, judge of the United States District Court for the Northern District of New York
 Charles Smith (cowboy), Arizona lawman and friend of Wyatt Earp
 Elihu Hubbard Smith, physician and man of letters, one of the Hartford Wits
 Harriet Beecher Stowe, abolitionist and author
 Benjamin Tallmadge, American military officer during the Revolutionary War
 Frederick A. Tallmadge, lawyer and New York politician
 Frank Livingston Underwood (1844–1918), banker, copper magnate, railroad founder
 Emily Noyes Vanderpoel (1842–1939), painter, writer, philanthropist
 Louis Fenn Wadsworth (1825–1908), early baseball pioneer
 Paul Winter, saxophonist
 Oliver Wolcott Sr., signer of the U.S. Declaration of Independence
 Oliver Wolcott Jr., US Secretary of the Treasury, 24th governor of Connecticut

On the National Register of Historic Places

 Capt. William Bull Tavern – CT 202 (added July 30, 1983)
 Henry B. Bissell House – 202 Maple St. (added October 7, 1990)
 J. Howard Catlin House – 14 Knife Shop Rd. (added September 6, 1993) (Since demolished)
 Litchfield Historic District – Roughly both sides of North and South Sts. between Gallows Lane and Prospect St. (added December 24, 1968)
 Milton Center Historic District (added March 14, 1978)
 Humaston Brook State Park (added May 8, 1997)
 Oliver Wolcott House – South St. (added December 11, 1971)
 Rye House – 122–132 Old Mount Tom Rd. (added September 10, 2000)
 Tapping Reeve House and Law School – South St. (added November 15, 1966)
 Topsmead – 25 and 46 Chase Rd. (added December 19, 1993)

See also

List of newspapers in Connecticut#Litchfield
Litchfield Law School
White Memorial Foundation
White Memorial Conservation Center

References

Further reading
Carley, Rachel. Litchfield: The Making of a New England Town (Litchfield: Litchfield Historical Society, 2011). 303 pp.

External links
 
Official town website
Litchfield Historical Society
Litchfield, Connecticut, at City-Data.com
ePodunk Profile for Litchfield, Connecticut

 
Towns in Litchfield County, Connecticut
Towns in the New York metropolitan area
Towns in Connecticut